Club Universitario de Ferrol, also known as Baxi Ferrol for sponsorship reasons, is a women's professional Basketball team based in Ferrol, Spain. The team currently plays in the top tier of the Spanish League.

Current roster

Season by season

References

External links
 Official website

Liga Femenina de Baloncesto teams
Women's basketball teams in Spain
Ferrol, Spain
Basketball teams in Galicia (Spain)